Frances G. Beinecke (born August 2, 1949) is an environmental activist and politician. She served as the former president of the Natural Resources Defense Council from 2006 to 2015.

Early life and education 
Beinecke is the youngest of four children born to William Sperry Beinecke and Elizabeth Beinecke. She was born in New Jersey.

She received a bachelor's degree from Yale College in 1971 and a master's degree from the Yale School of Forestry and Environmental Studies in 1974.

Career 
Beinecke first joined the Natural Resources Defense Council in 1973 as an intern. In 2006, she was nominated to president of the organization, only the second person to ever hold the position. She had previously served as their executive director for eight years.

She was appointed by President Barack Obama to the National Commission on the BP Deepwater Horizon Oil Spill and Offshore Drilling in 2010.

She currently serves on the boards of the World Resources Institute, the Energy Future Coalition, the Nicholas Institute for Environmental Policy Solutions, the Nature Conservancy, and Conservation International's Center for Environmental Leadership in Business. She previously served on the boards of the Wilderness Society, the China-U.S. Center for Sustainable Development, and the New York League of Conservation Voters.

Personal life 
Beinecke married Paul Elston in 1977. They have three children.

Former classmate and actress Sigourney Weaver has stated that she uses Beinecke as inspiration when she plays a strong female character.

Awards and honors 
In 1990, The Wilderness Society awarded Beinecke the Robert Marshall Award, their highest award presented to a private citizen who has never held federal office.

In 2007, Beinecke was awarded The National Audubon Society's prestigious Rachel Carson Award, a premier award honoring distinguished American women environmentalists.

She was one of five alumni to be awarded Yale's prestigious Yale Medal for outstanding individual service to the university.

Lehman College presented Beinecke with an honorary degree in 2013.

Works
Clean Energy Common Sense: An American Call To Action On Global Climate Change, with Bob Deans, Rowman & Littlefield, 2010, OCLC 460060057

References

External links
Profile at Natural Resources Defense Council
Column archive at The Huffington Post

Frances G. Beinecke at SourceWatch

1949 births
American women environmentalists
American environmentalists
Environmental bloggers
Living people
Natural Resources Defense Council people
Yale College alumni
Yale School of Forestry & Environmental Studies alumni
American women columnists
HuffPost bloggers
21st-century American women